is a Japanese football player who plays for Kamatamare Sanuki.

Club statistics
Updated to 23 February 2020.

References

External links

Profile at Kamatamare Sanuki

1984 births
Living people
Association football people from Kagawa Prefecture
Japanese footballers
J1 League players
J2 League players
J3 League players
Japan Football League players
Sanfrecce Hiroshima players
Montedio Yamagata players
FC Gifu players
Tochigi SC players
Kamatamare Sanuki players
Association football midfielders